Elizabeth Michelle Belding is a computer scientist specializing in mobile computing and wireless networks.
She is a professor of computer science at the University of California, Santa Barbara.

Education and career
Belding graduated from Florida State University in 1996 with two degrees: one in computer science and a second in applied mathematics. Both degrees were Summa Cum Laude with Honors.
She went to the University of California, Santa Barbara on a National Science Foundation Graduate Fellowship, and
completed her Ph.D. in electrical and computer engineering in 2000. Her dissertation, under the name Elizabeth Michelle Royer, was Routing in Ad hoc Mobile Networks: On-Demand and Hierarchical Strategies, and was jointly supervised by P. Michael Melliar-Smith and Louise Moser.

She has been a member of the computer science faculty at the University of California, Santa Barbara since 2000.

Recognition
Belding was named Fellow of the Institute of Electrical and Electronics Engineers (IEEE) in 2014 for "contributions to mobile and wireless networking and communication protocols".
She was elected as an ACM Fellow in 2018 for "contributions to communication in mobile networks and their deployment in developing regions".

One of her publications, on Ad hoc On-Demand Distance Vector Routing in mobile networks, was selected for the SIGMOBILE Test of Time Award in 2018.

References

External links

Living people
American women computer scientists
Florida State University alumni
University of California, Santa Barbara alumni
University of California, Santa Barbara faculty
Fellow Members of the IEEE
Fellows of the Association for Computing Machinery
Year of birth missing (living people)
Place of birth missing (living people)
American computer scientists
21st-century American women scientists